A Police Superintendent Accuses is a 1973 Romanian crime drama film by Sergiu Nicolaescu and starring himself as Police Commissioner Tudor Moldovan. The film is based on a true event, the Jilava Massacre which took place during World War II.

Plot
The story takes place in 1940 in Bucharest, Romania. The main character, police superintendent Moldovan, is responsible for investigating an organized massacre at the Viraga prison. In the massacre political opponents of the fascist regime of 1940 were killed, including a group of communist activists.
The murderers belong to the powerful pro-Nazi Iron Guard organisation (also known as "Legion"), so Moldovan has to confront the legionnaires and personally one of their leaders, the former criminal Paraipan (Gheorghe Dinica).

Cast
 Sergiu Nicolaescu as police commissioner Tudor Moldovan
 Jean Constantin as the pocket thief Limba
 Gheorghe Dinică as the legionary commissioner Paraipan
 Amza Pellea as worker Pirvu
 Ion Besoiu as the police prefect Vișan Năvodeanu
  as Professor Stavru Naumescu
 Ștefan Mihăilescu-Brăila as Nea Costache
 Alexandru Dobrescu as lawyer Marin
 Marin Moraru as commissioner Ghiță Petrescu
 Vasile Nițulescu as commissioner Ilarie Bucur
 Jean Lorin Florescu as Alexandru Dincă

References

External links
 

1973 films
1970s crime drama films
Films directed by Sergiu Nicolaescu
1970s Romanian-language films
Political thriller films
World War II films based on actual events
Films set in 1940
Films set in Bucharest
Romanian crime drama films
1970s war drama films
1973 drama films
1975 drama films
1975 films